Boswell's Corner is a census-designated place in Stafford County, Virginia. The population as of the 2010 Census was 1,375. It is located along U.S. Route 1 just outside the boundary of Marine Corps Base Quantico ("Boswell's Corner" itself is the intersection with Telegraph Road).

References

Census-designated places in Stafford County, Virginia
Census-designated places in Virginia